The Bach Aircraft Company was established by aviator L. Morton Bach at Clover Field, Santa Monica, California in 1927 to manufacture tri-motor airliners as the Bach Air Yacht in various models, as well as several other aircraft. The company hired Waldo Waterman as its chief test pilot, who brought on Max B. Harlow as the chief engineer. In 1931, the business was reorganized into the Aircraft Production Corporation but did not manufacture any further new designs.

Aircraft

References

Notes

Bibliography

External links

 aerofiles.com
 Photo history of NC302E

Bach aircraft
Defunct aircraft manufacturers of the United States
Companies based in Santa Monica, California
Defunct manufacturing companies based in Greater Los Angeles